This is a list of notable providers of Evolution-Data Optimized (EV-DO) infrastructure equipment:

 Airvana in partnership with Nortel, provides EV-DO infrastructure to Verizon Wireless, Sprint Corporation in North America.
 Alcatel-Lucent is the supplier for a majority of CDMA operators, including Verizon Wireless, U.S. Cellular and Sprint Corporation
 Bridgewater systems
 Ericsson has done several trials in China and has commercial deployment in South America.
 Huawei
 Motorola provides cellular infrastructure to Sprint, Verizon, and other operators.
 Nortel
 Samsung
 Tellabs
 ZTE has deployed CDMA EV-DO networks in Sudan, Morocco and India

References

Lists of telecommunications companies
Mobile telecommunications